Lieutenant General Sir Robert Jeremy "Robin" Ross,  (born 28 November 1939) is a former Royal Marines officer who served as Commandant General Royal Marines from 1994 to 1996.

Military career
Educated at Wellington College and Corpus Christi College, Cambridge, Ross joined the Royal Marines in 1957. He became Commanding Officer of 40 Commando in 1979, commander of 3 Commando Brigade in 1986 and Commander, Training and Reserves in 1988. He was appointed Commander, Commando Forces in 1990 and led an Anglo-Dutch Force that took part in Operation Safe Haven, a humanitarian operation to protect the Kurdish people in Northern Iraq in 1991. He became Commandant General Royal Marines in 1994, and retired in 1996.

Later life
Upon retirement Ross became President of SSAFA Forces Help, a member of the International Investment Council of South Africa, and a churchwarden of St John the Baptist Church at Berwick St John in Wiltshire.

Family
In 1965 Ross married Sara Curtis; they have one son and one daughter.

References

1939 births
Alumni of Corpus Christi College, Cambridge
Knights Commander of the Order of the Bath
Living people
Officers of the Legion of Merit
Officers of the Order of the British Empire
People educated at Wellington College, Berkshire
Recipients of the Decoration of Merit
Royal Marines generals
Royal Navy personnel of the Gulf War